Jangheung Wi clan is one of the Korean clans. Their Bon-gwan is in Jangheung County, South Jeolla Province. According to the research held in 2015, the number of Jangheung Wi clan’s member was 30450. Wi clan was a kind of naturalized clan in Tang dynasty. Emperor Taizong of Tang send him as one of the Eight Scholars because Queen Seondeok in Silla appealed to send scholars to Tang dynasty in 638. After  went to Silla, he was appointed as a Minister or Secretary (shàngshū). Then, he founded Jangheung Wi clan.

See also 
 Korean clan names of foreign origin

References

External links 
 

 
Korean clan names of Chinese origin
Wi clans